Asabenkei Daikichi (Japanese 朝弁慶 大吉, born February 12, 1989, as Yasunobu Sakai) is a Japanese professional sumo wrestler from Kanagawa. He debuted in March 2007 and he reached his highest rank of juryo 7 in July 2016. He currently wrestles for Takasago stable and has won one yusho in the sandanme division.

Early life 
Born in Hiratsuka, his parents owned a Chinese restaurant, the rival of which was called Benkei from which he derived his shikona. He belonged to his high school's judo club and as he approached graduation he was 190cm tall. After he graduated high school in 2007 he joined Takasago stable.

Career
His initial shikona was Asasakai Yasunobu from March 2007 to March 2009, and from May 2009 he wrestled as Asabenkei Keisei, however he changed his personal name another three times until January 2013 where he returned his shikona to Asabenkei Keisei. 

He was first promoted to juryo in November 2015, after over eight years in sumo. At the time, the 34-year-old Asasekiryu was Takasago stable's only sekitori, and Asabenkei spoke of his desire to keep the stable's streak of always having sekitori since 1878 going. At a press conference his head coach Takasago, the former ozeki Asashio Tarō IV said, "I want him to become strong like Benkei." He was the first wrestler from Kanagawa Prefecture to reach juryo since Asanosho 22 years earlier. In his juryo debut he posted a 6–9 record. After six straight tournaments in juryo he lost sekitori status after the November 2016 tournament. In May 2018 he returned to juryo for the first time in nine tournaments, but he tore his meniscus during the tournament and withdrew on the 13th day with a 3–10 record, his first injury absence since May 2011. The injury required an operation and forced him to sit out two consecutive tournaments. Upon his return from kyujo in November 2018, he had fallen from juryo 12 back down to sandanme 25. That tournament he posted a 4–3 record, however, the next tournament in January 2019, he claimed the sandanme yusho with a perfect record of 7-0, or a zensho-yusho. 

He once again returned to juryo in July 2020 where he had a losing record of 3-12 which sent him back to makushita where he still currently wrestles as of July 2021.

Fighting style 
Asabenkei is an oshi style wrestler with the majority of his wins coming via yorikiri or oshidashi.

Career record

See also
Glossary of sumo terms
List of active sumo wrestlers
List of the heaviest sumo wrestlers

References

External links 
 Asabenkei Daikichi's official page (English)

1989 births
Japanese sumo wrestlers
People from Kanagawa Prefecture
People from Hiratsuka, Kanagawa
Living people